The Bulgarian Communist Party (BKP) is a communist party in Bulgaria, registered in 1990.

The BKP was founded on 25 April 1990 as the Party of the Working People which split from the Bulgarian Socialist Party. Renamed on 21 June 1990 the BKP proclaimed on 24 September 1990 being the successor of the original BKP.

The BKP took part in the parliamentary elections of 1991, 1994 and 1997, winning the best result in 1994 with 1,5%. In 2003, joint lists with the Communist Party of Bulgaria won 12 seats and five mayoral posts in local elections. The candidacy of the secretary general Vladimir Spasov for the 2006 presidential election failed because insufficient supporting signatures were collected.

The BKP cooperates with other Stalinist parties. In 1995, it hosted the foundation of a New Communist International. Today it is a member party of the International Coordination of Revolutionary Parties and Organizations.

The BKP published the newspaper  Komunistichesko Delo.

References

1990 establishments in Bulgaria
Communist parties in Bulgaria
Anti-revisionist organizations
Stalinist parties
International Coordination of Revolutionary Parties and Organizations